Once More 'Round the Sun is the sixth studio album by American heavy metal band Mastodon. It was released on June 24, 2014, via Reprise Records. On April 17, 2014, Mastodon released the album's first single, "High Road". On June 16, 2014, the album was made available for streaming on iTunes. Once More 'Round the Sun sold around 34,000 copies in the United States in its first week of release to land at position No. 6 on the Billboard 200 chart, making it the band's highest-peaking album on the chart and their second consecutive Top 10 debut after their previous album, The Hunter, peaked at No. 10.

Background
In late 2012, Mastodon guitarist Brent Hinds mentioned in an interview that he had begun writing material for the band's next release. The band continued writing and demoing their sixth studio album throughout 2013, while touring for their 2011 release The Hunter. The band began recording in late 2013 at Rock Falcon Studios in Franklin, Tennessee, with producer Nick Raskulinecz.

Musical style
Troy Sanders stated in an interview that the album is a continuation where the band left off with their previous one, The Hunter.

Bill Kelliher stated also about the album's musical style: "We're always trying to surprise ourselves and write something that's new and fresh. It's definitely got the elements of The Hunter in there, but also [of] Remission and some heavier stuff. There's a lot of different influences, from Alice in Chains to Deftones. There's a lot of rock going on."

Brann Dailor stated following about the album: "It's gonna be massive and insane, lots of epic greatness. There will be lots of huge riffs and new directions. It's real weird, real "math-y", real straightforward. It's up, down and all around."

Kelliher also stated that the album's theme might be "death". He stated the following: "It always makes for really good story telling. It's kind of the theme that we have a lot in our music. We've had a lot of friends pass away since the last record. I'm not really sure yet. I think we're kind of focusing more about living on this earth and what would happen if this was your last year to live. I think that's sort of maybe a little bit of what we might be kind of touching on."

Artwork
Oakland-based artist Skinner, who characterizes his work as "psychedelic nightmare paintings", created the album's artwork. Prior to its release, bassist and vocalist Troy Sanders stated: "It's going to be a work of art for sure. It's going to be very eye-opening. Very striking. It's from another dimension, and a lot of our music is geared toward that idea—taking you to another planet on songs. It's out there, and I think it's incredible."

Critical response

Once More 'Round the Sun was well received by contemporary music critics upon its initial release. At Metacritic, which assigns a normalized rating out of 100 to reviews from music critics, the album received an average score of 78, which indicates "generally favorable reviews", based on 30 reviews.

In the review for AllMusic, writer Thom Jurek wrote that "Once More 'Round the Sun furthers what Mastodon began on The Hunter: expanding their music past metal's rigid borders – toward an integrative sound that doesn't leave metal out." Michael Madden also praised the album in the review for Consequence of Sound, claiming that "Mastodon are starting to look more like that band's peers , not disciples. Nick Raskulinecz's eternally crunchy production helps them reach those heights on Once More 'Round the Sun, and, as Oakland artist Skinner's cover suggests, the record is vibrant, too. There could be more structural risk-taking and the band could stand to have more grandiose moments, but, well, you know: consider them six for six." Dom Lawson spoke highly of the album in his review for The Guardian, writing that "Once More 'Round the Sun sounds very much like the album they need to make to edge a little further into the mainstream – it has a largely straightforward air and a tendency to favour the big hooks of 2011's The Hunter over the labyrinthine weirdness of 2009's Crack the Skye."

Giving the album an eight out of ten for PopMatters, Dean Brown felt that "when compared to the band's previous stratospheric evolutions, its substance may be just as important to the tale of Mastodon when the inevitable is written, hopefully decades into the future and many albums later from one of the best bands, regardless of genre, roaming the earth at present." Spin writer Johnathan Zwickel shared similar sentiments, claiming that "While the rest of heavy music's luminaries follow in their wake, Mastodon's sound – and their ambition – is bigger than metal."

Zoe Camp was more critical of the album in the review for Pitchfork, stating "it's possible to view Once More 'Round the Sun as a vow to honor their roots, even as they set out in search of broader horizons. So far, however, Mastodon's paradigms simply don't mesh the way they should. Evolution takes time, and Mastodon continue to publicly work out their growing pains as they determine which traits best represent the unified sound they've been chasing this decade."

Accolades
The album appeared on several album of the year lists published in 2014. Kerrang! ranked it as its 28th best album of the year, it appeared on Decibel magazine's end-of year list at #29 and on Terrorizer magazine's list at #35. Loudwire list the album as number 5 on their list of the 20 Best Metal Albums of 2014 and the song "Chimes at Midnight" at number 3 on their list of the 20 Best Metal Songs of 2014. Metalsucks ranked it as the 20th best metal album of the decade.

Track listing
All lyrics and music by Mastodon, except additional lyrics on "Diamond in the Witch House" by Scott Kelly.

Personnel
Mastodon
Troy Sanders – vocals, bass, bass pedals, keyboards
Brent Hinds – vocals, lead guitar
Brann Dailor – vocals, drums
Bill Kelliher – rhythm guitar

Others
Nick Raskulinecz – production
Ted Jensen – mastering
Scott Kelly – vocals and additional lyrics on "Diamond in the Witch House"
Gary Lindsey (chorus) & The Coathangers (ending) – additional vocals on "Aunt Lisa"
Valient Himself – additional backing vocals on "Asleep in the Deep"
Isaiah "Ikey" Owens – synthesizer on "Asleep in the Deep"
"Once More 'Round the Sun" contains samples from "Cowboy Song" written by B. Downey & P. Lynott

Charts

Weekly charts

Year-end charts

References

Mastodon (band) albums
2014 albums
Reprise Records albums
Albums produced by Nick Raskulinecz